Darwall is a surname. Notable people with the surname include:

John Darwall (1731–1789), English Anglican clergyman and hymnodist
Stephen Darwall (born 1946), American philosopher

See also
Darwall-Smith